The 1974–75 St. Louis Blues season was the St. Louis Blues' eighth season in the National Hockey League (NHL).

Offseason

NHL Draft
Below are listed the selections in the 1974 NHL amateur draft:

Regular season

Final standings

Schedule and results

Player statistics

Regular season
Scoring

Goaltending

Playoffs
Scoring

Goaltending

References
 Blues on Hockey Database

St. Louis Blues seasons
St. Louis
St. Louis
St Louis
St Louis